The 2022–23 UConn Huskies men's basketball team represents the University of Connecticut in the 2022–23 NCAA Division I men's basketball season. The Huskies are led by fifth-year head coach Dan Hurley in the team's third season since their return to the Big East Conference. The Huskies play their home games at the Harry A. Gampel Pavilion in Storrs, Connecticut and the XL Center in Hartford, Connecticut.

Previous season
The Huskies finished the season 23–10, 13–6 in Big East play to finish in third place. They defeated Seton Hall in the quarterfinals to advance to the semifinals of the Big East tournament where they lost to Villanova. They received an at-large bid to the NCAA tournament as the No. 5 seed in the West Region, where they were upset in the First Round by New Mexico State.

Offseason

Departures

Incoming transfers

2022 recruiting class

2023 Recruiting class

Roster

Schedule and results

|-
!colspan=12 style=|Non-conference regular season

|-
!colspan=12 style=|Big East regular season

|-
!colspan=9 style="|Big East tournament

|-
!colspan=12 style=| NCAA Tournament

Source

Rankings

*AP does not release post-NCAA Tournament rankings.

References

UConn Huskies men's basketball seasons
Connecticut
Connecticut Huskies men's basketball
Connecticut Huskies men's basketball
UConn